Oleksandr Bohdanovych Romanchuk (born 16 December 1999) is a Ukrainian professional footballer who plays as a centre-back for Hungarian club Debrecen.

Club career

Early years
Born in Ivano-Frankivsk Oblast, Romanchuk began his career in the local Prykarpattia Ivano-Frankivsk academy, with his firsts coaches Anatoliy Redushko, until his transfer to Lviv academy in 2016.

Lviv
He played in the Ukrainian Second League for Lviv.

Dynamo Kyiv
In July 2018 he moved to Ukrainian Premier League club Dynamo Kyiv. However, he never made the debut for the senior squad.

Return to Lviv
In August 2020 he returned to Lviv and played for the reserves squad in the Ukrainian Premier League Reserves, and also in the Ukrainian Premier League, where Romanchuk made his debut for Lviv as a substituted second-half player on 12 September 2020, in a losing away match against Kolos Kovalivka.

Debrecen
On 20 July 2022, he moved to Hungarian club Debrecen.

References

External links 
 
 

1999 births
Living people
People from Kolomyia
Ukrainian footballers
Ukraine under-21 international footballers
Association football defenders
FC Lviv players
FC Dynamo Kyiv players
Debreceni VSC players
Ukrainian Premier League players
Ukrainian Second League players
Ukrainian Amateur Football Championship players
Ukrainian expatriate footballers
Expatriate footballers in Hungary
Ukrainian expatriate sportspeople in Hungary
Sportspeople from Ivano-Frankivsk Oblast